Various non-human animal species exhibit behavior that can be interpreted as homosexual or bisexual. This may include same-sex sexual activity, courtship, affection, pair bonding, and parenting among same-sex animal pairs. Various forms of this are found in every major geographic region and every major animal group. The sexual behavior of non-human animals takes many different forms, even within the same species, though homosexual behavior is best known from social species.

Scientists perceive homosexual behavior in animals to different degrees. According to Bruce Bagemihl, same-sex behavior (comprising courtship, sexual, pair-bonding, and parental activities) has been documented in over 450 species of animals worldwide. Although same-sex interactions involving genital contact have been reported in hundreds of animal species, they are routinely manifested in only a few, including humans. Simon LeVay stated that "[a]lthough homosexual behavior is very common in the animal world, it seems to be very uncommon that individual animals have a long-lasting predisposition to engage in such behavior to the exclusion of heterosexual activities. Thus, a homosexual orientation, if one can speak of such thing in animals, seems to be a rarity." The motivations for and implications of these behaviors are lensed through anthropocentric thinking; Bagemihl notes that any hypothesis is "necessarily an account of human interpretations of these phenomena".

One species in which exclusive homosexual orientation occurs is the domesticated sheep (Ovis aries). "About 10% of rams (males), refuse to mate with ewes (females) but do readily mate with other rams."

In relation to humans

Applying the term homosexual to animals
The term homosexual was coined by the Hungarian writer and campaigner Karl Maria Kertbeny in 1868 to describe same-sex sexual attraction and sexual behavior in humans. Its use in animal studies has been controversial for two main reasons: animal sexuality and motivating factors have been and remain poorly understood, and the term has strong cultural implications in western society that are irrelevant for species other than humans.  Thus homosexual behavior has been given a number of terms over the years.  According to Bruce Bagemihl, when describing animals, the term homosexual is preferred over gay, lesbian, and other terms currently in use, as these are seen as even more bound to human homosexuality.

Bailey et al. says:Homosexual: in animals, this has been used to refer to same-sex behavior that is not sexual in character (e.g. 'homosexual tandem running' in termites), same-sex courtship or copulatory behavior occurring over a short period of time (e.g. 'homosexual mounting' in cockroaches and rams) or long-term pair bonds between same-sex partners that might involve any combination of courting, copulating, parenting and affectional behaviors (e.g. 'homosexual pair bonds' in gulls). In humans, the term is used to describe individual sexual behaviors as well as long-term relationships, but in some usages connotes a gay or lesbian social identity. Scientific writing would benefit from reserving this anthropomorphic term for humans and not using it to describe behavior in other animals, because of its deeply rooted context in human society.Animal preference and motivation is always inferred from behavior. In wild animals, researchers will as a rule not be able to map the entire life of an individual, and must infer from frequency of single observations of behavior. The correct usage of the term homosexual is that an animal exhibits homosexual behavior or even same-sex sexual behavior; however, this article conforms to the usage by modern research, applying the term homosexuality to all sexual behavior (copulation, genital stimulation, mating games and sexual display behavior) between animals of the same sex. In most instances, it is presumed that the homosexual behavior is but part of the animal's overall sexual behavioral repertoire, making the animal "bisexual" rather than "homosexual" as the terms are commonly understood in humans.

Nature
The observation of homosexual behavior in animals can be seen as both an argument for and against the acceptance of homosexuality in humans, and has been used especially against the claim that it is a peccatum contra naturam ("sin against nature"). For instance, homosexuality in animals was cited by the American Psychiatric Association and other groups in their amici curiae brief to the United States Supreme Court in Lawrence v. Texas, which ultimately struck down the sodomy laws of 14 states.

Research
A majority of the research available concerning homosexual behavior in animals lacks specification between animals that exclusively exhibit same-sex tendencies and those that participate in heterosexual and homosexual mating activities interchangeably. This lack of distinction has led to differing opinions and conflicting interpretations of collected data amongst scientists and researchers. For instance, Bruce Bagemihl, author of the book Biological Exuberence: Animal Homosexuality and Natural Diversity, emphasizes that there are no anatomical or endocrinological differences between exclusively homosexual and exclusively heterosexual animal pairs. However, if the definition of "homosexual behavior" is made to include animals that participate in both same-sex and opposite-sex mating activities, hormonal differences have been documented among key sex hormones, such as testosterone and estradiol, when compared to those who participate solely in heterosexual mating.

Many of the animals used in laboratory-based studies of homosexuality do not appear to spontaneously exhibit these tendencies often in the wild. Such behavior is often elicited and exaggerated by the researcher during experimentation through the destruction of a portion of brain tissue, or by exposing the animal to high levels of steroid hormones prenatally. Information gathered from these studies is limited when applied to spontaneously occurring same-sex behavior in animals outside of the laboratory.

Homosexual behaviour in animals has been discussed since classical antiquity. The earliest written mention of animal homosexuality appears to date back to 2,300 years ago, when Aristotle (384–322 BC) described copulation between pigeons, partridges and quails of the same sex. The Hieroglyphics of Horapollo, written in the 4th century AD by the Egyptian writer Horapollo, mentions "hermaphroditism" in hyenas and homosexuality in partridges. The first review of animal homosexuality was written by the zoologist Ferdinand Karsch-Haack in 1900.

Academic research into the ubiquity of same-sex sexual behavior was not carried out on a large scale, possibly due to observer bias caused by social attitudes to same-sex sexual behavior, innocent confusion, lack of interest, distaste, scientists fearing loss of their grants or even from a fear of "being ridiculed by their colleagues". Georgetown University biologist Janet Mann states "Scientists who study the topic are often accused of trying to forward an agenda, and their work can come under greater scrutiny than that of their colleagues who study other topics." They also noted "Not every sexual act has a reproductive function ... that's true of humans and non-humans." Studies have demonstrated homosexual behavior in a number of species, but the true extent of homosexuality in animals is not known.

Some researchers believe this behavior to have its origin in male social organization and social dominance, similar to the dominance traits shown in prison sexuality. Others, particularly Bagemihl, Joan Roughgarden, Thierry Lodé and Paul Vasey suggest the social function of sex (both homosexual and heterosexual) is not necessarily connected to dominance, but serves to strengthen alliances and social ties within a flock. While reports on many such mating scenarios are still only anecdotal, a growing body of scientific work confirms that permanent homosexuality occurs not only in species with permanent pair bonds, but also in non-monogamous species like sheep. One report on sheep found that 8% of rams exhibited homosexual preferences—that is, even when given a choice, they chose male over female partners. In fact, apparent homosexual individuals are known from all of the traditional domestic species, from sheep, cattle and horses to cats, dogs and budgerigars.

Basis
Sexual behaviors often require a significant energy investment. When sexual behaviors produce offspring, there is an obvious benefit for the animal. However, the benefit from performing homosexual behaviors (which cannot result in the production of offspring) is less obvious, and some scientists have called it a "Darwinian paradox" because it is non-reproductive. A number of non-exclusive different explanations for the emergence of such traits have been put forward.

Physiological basis
A definite physiological explanation or reason for homosexual activity in animal species has not been agreed upon by researchers in the field. Numerous scholars are of the opinion that varying levels (either higher or lower) of the sex hormones in the animal, in addition to the size of the animal's gonads, play a direct role in the sexual behavior and preference exhibited by that animal. Others firmly argue no evidence to support these claims exists when comparing animals of a specific species exhibiting homosexual behavior exclusively and those that do not. Ultimately, empirical support from comprehensive endocrinological studies exist for both interpretations. Researchers found no evidence of differences in the measurements of the gonads, or the levels of the sex hormones of exclusively homosexual western gulls and ring-billed gulls.

Additional studies pertaining to hormone involvement in homosexual behavior indicate that when administering treatments of testosterone and estradiol to female heterosexual animals, the elevated hormone levels increase the likelihood of homosexual behavior. Additionally, boosting the levels of sex hormones during an animal's pregnancy appears to increase the likelihood of it birthing a homosexual offspring.

Genetic basis
Researchers found that disabling the fucose mutarotase (FucM) gene in laboratory mice – which influences the levels of estrogen to which the brain is exposed – caused the female mice to behave as if they were male as they grew up. "The mutant female mouse underwent a slightly altered developmental programme in the brain to resemble the male brain in terms of sexual preference" said Professor Chankyu Park of the Korea Advanced Institute of Science and Technology in Daejon, South Korea, who led the research. His findings were published in the BMC Genetics journal on July 7, 2010. Another study found that by manipulating a gene in fruit flies (Drosophila), homosexual behavior appeared to have been induced. However, in addition to homosexual behavior, several abnormal behaviors were also exhibited apparently due to this mutation.

Neurobiological basis
In March 2011, research showed that serotonin is involved in the mechanism of sexual orientation of mice. A study conducted on fruit flies found that inhibiting the dopamine neurotransmitter inhibited lab-induced homosexual behavior.

Other hypotheses 

One proposal for the adaptive function of homosexual behavior is the formation of alliances and mutual social benefit to the animals. Studies support this in specific species, such as black swans, where a quarter of mate pairs consist of two males, who mate with a female and chase her away once she lays the egg, then raise it themselves. These M-M pairs have great success in defending their territory and resources, and keep their young alive until fledgling 80% of the time, compared to 30% for M-F pairs.

Studies done on homosexual behavior in birds showed a negative correlation between relative parental investment and F-F homosexual behaviors, i.e. females that invested more time and care into their young relative to males had less homosexual encounters. Similarly, there was a negative correlation between relative parental investment and M-M homosexual behaviors. This meant that species exhibiting a high degree of polygamy (where females often are the exclusive caretakers of the young) F-F sexual behaviors were very rare, whereas in a socially monogamous species (in which a M-F pair works together to care for young) they were much more common. The trend was opposite for males, in polygamous species M-M sexual behaviors were quite common and in socially monogamous species they were rare. The study argues that release from parental care, a very energy intensive investment, allows the opportunities for homosexual behaviors to be exhibited, and higher parental care prevents homosexual behaviors from occurring because of the energy cost of the behaviors.

A 2019 paper hypothesized that when sex first began to evolve, there was no distinction between homosexuality and heterosexuality, and animals mated with other members of their species indiscriminately. This is a contrast to most perspectives, which try to find explanations for the evolution of homosexual behaviors and separate it completely from the evolution of heterosexual behaviors. The study states that it is unlikely that sexual behaviors evolved simultaneously to the evolution of traits necessary to recognize a compatible sexual mate, such as size, shape, odor, and color. As those secondary sex characteristics evolved, sexuality would have become more discriminatory, leading to less homosexuality, but homosexual behaviors would rarely have had enough cost to be selected against and removed entirely from a population. Additionally, the cost of homosexual behavior would be offset by the cost of mate recognition, which requires psychological adaptations, and excessive discrimination in mate choice can lead to missing out of mating opportunities. With indiscriminate mating, these factors are irrelevant. The paper notes that in some species, especially where survival is very difficult and each energy-related decision could mean the animal's death, homosexual behavior would be strongly selected against, leading strictly heterosexual species.

Some select species and groups

Birds

Black swans

An estimated one-quarter of all black swan pairings are of males. They steal nests, or form temporary threesomes with females to obtain eggs, driving away the female after she lays the eggs. The males spent time in each other's society, guarded the common territory, performed greeting ceremonies before each other, and (in the reproductive period) pre-marital rituals, and if one of the birds tried to sit on the other, an intense fight began. More of their cygnets survive to adulthood than those of different-sex pairs, possibly due to their superior ability to defend large portions of land. The same reasoning has been applied to male flamingo pairs raising chicks.

Albatrosses
Female Laysan albatrosses, on the north-western tip of the island of Oahu, Hawaii, form pairs for co-growing offspring. On the observed island, the number of females considerably exceeds the number of males (59% N=102/172), so 31% of females, after mating with males, create partnerships for hatching and feeding chicks. Compared to male-female couples, female partnerships have a lower hatching rate (41% vs 87%) and lower overall reproductive success (31% vs. 67%).

Warming waters from climate change have led to increased foraging times and thus increased mortality among female black-browed albatrosses on the Antipodes Islands in New Zealand. The skewed gender imbalance has led to many male albatrosses forming homosexual relationships. Male-male pairs now comprise between 2 - 5% of the albatross population on the islands.

Blue ducks 
In 2009, a UK-based captive breeding program for blue ducks (involving two males and one female) was derailed when the two males paired with each other instead of with the female that they were assigned to mate with.

Ibises

Research has shown that the environmental pollutant methylmercury can increase the prevalence of homosexual behavior in male American white ibis. The study involved exposing chicks in varying dosages to the chemical and measuring the degree of homosexual behavior in adulthood. The results discovered was that as the dosage was increased the likelihood of homosexual behavior also increased. The endocrine blocking feature of mercury has been suggested as a possible cause of sexual disruption in other bird species.

Mallards

Mallards form male-female pairs only until the female lays eggs, at which time the male leaves the female. Mallards have rates of male-male sexual activity that are unusually high for birds, in some cases, as high as 19% of all pairs in a population. Kees Moeliker of the Natural History Museum Rotterdam has observed one male mallard engage in homosexual necrophilia.

Penguins

Penguins have been observed to engage in homosexual behaviour since at least as early as 1911. George Murray Levick, who documented this behaviour in Adélie penguins at Cape Adare, described it as "depraved". The report was considered too shocking for public release at the time, and was suppressed. The only copies that were made available privately to researchers had the English text partly written in Greek letters, to prevent this knowledge becoming more widely known. The report was unearthed only a century later, and published in Polar Record in June 2012.

In early February 2004, The New York Times reported that Roy and Silo, a male pair of chinstrap penguins in the Central Park Zoo in New York City, had successfully hatched and fostered a female chick from a fertile egg they had been given to incubate. Other penguins in New York zoos have also been reported to have formed same-sex pairs.

In Odense Zoo in Denmark, a pair of male king penguins adopted an egg that had been abandoned by a female, proceeding to incubate it and raise the chick.
Zoos in Japan and Germany have also documented homosexual male penguin couples. The couples have been shown to build nests together and use a stone as a substitute for an egg. Researchers at Rikkyo University in Tokyo found 20 homosexual pairs at 16 major aquariums and zoos in Japan.

The Bremerhaven Zoo in Germany attempted to encourage reproduction of endangered Humboldt penguins by importing females from Sweden and separating three male pairs, but this was unsuccessful. The zoo's director said that the relationships were "too strong" between the homosexual pairs. German gay groups protested at this attempt to break up the male-male pairs but the zoo's director was reported as saying "We don't know whether the three male pairs are really homosexual or whether they have just bonded because of a shortage of females ... nobody here wants to forcibly separate homosexual couples."

A pair of male Magellanic penguins who had shared a burrow for six years at the San Francisco Zoo and raised a surrogate chick, split when the male of a pair in the next burrow died and the female sought a new mate.

Buddy and Pedro, a pair of male African penguins, were separated by the Toronto Zoo to mate with female penguins. Buddy has since paired off with a female.

Suki and Chupchikoni are two female African penguins that pair bonded at the Ramat Gan Safari in Israel. Chupchikoni was assumed to be male until her blood was tested.

In 2014 Jumbs and Hurricane, two Humboldt penguins at Wingham Wildlife Park became the center of international media attention as two male penguins who had pair bonded a number of years earlier and then successfully hatched and reared an egg given to them as surrogate parents after the mother abandoned it halfway through incubation.

As of 2018, two female King penguins at Kelly Tarltons in Auckland, New Zealand, called Thelma and Louise (named after the 1991 film) have been in a relationship for eight years, when most of the other eligible penguins switch partners each mating season, regardless of their orientation. The two penguins were both taking care of an egg that Thelma hatched, but is unknown whether it was fertilized.

Vultures
In 1998, two male griffon vultures named Dashik and Yehuda, at the Jerusalem Biblical Zoo, engaged in "open and energetic sex" and built a nest. The keepers provided the couple with an artificial egg, which the two parents took turns incubating, and 45 days later, the zoo replaced the egg with a baby vulture. The two male vultures raised the chick together. A few years later, however, Yehuda became interested in a female vulture that was brought into the aviary. Dashik became depressed, and was eventually moved to the zoological research garden at Tel Aviv University where he too set up a nest with a female vulture.

Two male vultures at the Allwetter Zoo in Muenster built a nest together, although they were picked on and their nest materials were often stolen by other vultures. They were eventually separated to try to promote breeding by placing one of them with female vultures, despite the protests of German homosexual groups.

Pigeons

Both male and female pigeons sometimes exhibit homosexual behavior. In addition to sexual behavior, same-sex pigeon pairs will build nests, and hens will lay (infertile) eggs and attempt to incubate them.

Mammals

Amazon dolphins
The Amazon river dolphin or boto has been reported to form up in bands of 3–5 individuals engaging in sexual activity. The groups usually comprise young males and sometimes one or two females. Sex is often performed in non-reproductive ways, using snout, flippers and genital rubbing, without regard to gender. In captivity, they have been observed to sometimes perform homosexual and heterosexual penetration of the blowhole, a hole homologous with the nostril of other mammals, making this the only known example of nasal sex in the animal kingdom. The males will sometimes also perform sex with males from the tucuxi species, a type of small porpoise.

American bisons

Courtship, mounting, and full anal penetration between bulls has been noted to occur among American bison. The Mandan nation Okipa festival concludes with a ceremonial enactment of this behavior, to "ensure the return of the buffalo in the coming season". Also, mounting of one female by another (known as "bulling") is extremely common among cattle. The behaviour is hormone driven and synchronizes with the emergence of estrus (heat), particularly in the presence of a bull.

Bats

More than 20 species of bat have been documented to engage in homosexual behavior. Bat species that have been observed engaging in homosexual behavior in the wild include:

Bat species that have been observed engaging in homosexual behavior in captivity include the Comoro flying fox (Pteropus livingstonii), the Rodrigues flying fox (Pteropus rodricensis) and the common vampire bat (Desmodus rotundus).

Homosexual behavior in bats has been categorized into 6 groups: mutual homosexual grooming and licking, homosexual masturbation, homosexual play, homosexual mounting, coercive sex, and cross-species homosexual sex.

In the wild, the grey-headed flying fox (Pteropus poliocephalus) engages in allogrooming wherein one partner licks and gently bites the chest and wing membrane of the other partner. Both sexes display this form of mutual homosexual grooming and it is more common in males. Males often have erect penises while they are mutually grooming each other. Like opposite-sex grooming partners, same-sex grooming partners continuously utter a "pre-copulation call", which is described as a "pulsed grating call", while engaged in this activity.

In wild Bonin flying foxes (Pteropus pselaphon), males perform fellatio or 'male-male genital licking' on other males. Male–male genital licking events occur repeatedly several times in the same pair, and reciprocal genital licking also occurs. The male-male genital licking in these bats is considered a sexual behavior. Allogrooming in Bonin flying foxes has never been observed, hence the male-male genital licking in this species does not seem to be a byproduct of allogrooming, but rather a behavior of directly licking the male genital area, independent of allogrooming. In captivity, same-sex genital licking has been observed among males of the Comoro flying fox (Pteropus livingstonii) as well as among males of the common vampire bat (Desmodus rotundus).

In wild Indian flying foxes (Pteropus giganteus), males often mount one another, with erections and thrusting, while play-wrestling. Males of the long-fingered bat (Myotis capaccinii) have been observed in the same position of male-female mounting, with one gripping the back of the other's fur. A similar behavior was also observed in the common bent-wing bat (Miniopterus schreibersii).

In wild little brown bats (Myotis lucifugus), males often mount other males (and females) during late autumn and winter, when many of the mounted individuals are torpid. 35% of matings during this period are homosexual. These coercive copulations usually include ejaculation and the mounted bat often makes a typical copulation call consisting of a long squawk. Similarly, in hibernacula of the common noctule (Nyctalus noctula), active males were observed to wake up from lethargy on a warm day and engage in mating with lethargic males and (active or lethargic) females. The lethargic males, like females, called out loudly and presented their buccal glands with opened mouth during copulation.

Vesey-Fitzgerald (1949) observed homosexual behaviours in all 12 British bat species known at the time: "Homosexuality is common in the spring in all species, and, since the males are in full possession of their powers, I suspect throughout the summer...I have even seen homosexuality between Natterer's and Daubenton's bats (Myotis nattereri and M. daubentonii)."

Bottlenose dolphins

Dolphins of several species engage in homosexual acts, though it is best studied in the bottlenose dolphins. Sexual encounters between females take the shape of "beak-genital propulsion", where one female inserts her beak in the genital opening of the other while swimming gently forward. Between males, homosexual behaviour includes rubbing of genitals against each other, which sometimes leads to the males swimming belly to belly, inserting the penis in the other's genital slit and sometimes anus.

Janet Mann, Georgetown University professor of biology and psychology, argues that the strong personal behavior among male dolphin calves is about bond formation and benefits the species in an evolutionary context. She cites studies showing that these dolphins later in life as adults are in a sense bisexual, and the male bonds forged earlier in life work together for protection as well as locating females to reproduce with. Confrontations between flocks of bottlenose dolphins and the related species Atlantic spotted dolphin will sometimes lead to cross-species homosexual behaviour between the males rather than combat.

Elephants

African and Asian male elephants will engage in same-sex bonding and mounting. Such encounters are often associated with affectionate interactions, such as kissing, trunk intertwining, and placing trunks in each other's mouths. Male elephants, who often live apart from the general herd, often form "companionships", consisting of an older individual and one or sometimes two younger males with sexual behavior being an important part of the social dynamic. Unlike heterosexual relations, which are always of a fleeting nature, the relationships between males may last for years. The encounters are analogous to heterosexual bouts, one male often extending his trunk along the other's back and pushing forward with his tusks to signify his intention to mount. Same-sex relations are common and frequent in both sexes, with Asiatic elephants in captivity devoting roughly 45% of sexual encounters to same-sex activity.

Giraffes

Male giraffes have been observed to engage in remarkably high frequencies of homosexual behavior. After aggressive "necking", it is common for two male giraffes to caress and court each other, leading up to mounting and climax. Such interactions between males have been found to be more frequent than heterosexual coupling. In one study, up to 94% of observed mounting incidents took place between two males. The proportion of same sex activities varied between 30 and 75%, and at any given time one in twenty males were engaged in non-combative necking behavior with another male. Only 1% of same-sex mounting incidents occurred between females.

Marmots

Homosexual behavior is quite common in wild marmots. In Olympic marmots (Marmota olympus) and hoary marmots (Marmota caligata), females often mount other females as well as engage in other affectionate and sexual behaviors with females of the same species. They display a high frequency of these behaviors especially when they are in heat. A homosexual encounter often begins with a greeting interaction in which one female nuzzles her nose on the other female's cheek or mouth, or both females touch noses or mouths. Additionally, a female may gently chew on the ear or neck of her partner, who responds by raising her tail. The first female may sniff the other's genital region or nuzzle that region with her mouth. She may then proceed to mount the other female, during which the mounting female gently grasps the mounted female's dorsal neck fur in her jaws while thrusting. The mounted female arches her back and holds her tail to one side to facilitate their sexual interaction.

Lions

Both male and female lions have been seen to interact homosexually. Male lions pair-bond for a number of days and initiate homosexual activity with affectionate nuzzling and caressing, leading to mounting and thrusting. About 8% of mountings have been observed to occur with other males. Pairings between females are held to be fairly common in captivity but have not been observed in the wild.

Polecats
European polecats (Mustela putorius) were found to engage homosexually with non-sibling animals. Exclusive homosexuality with mounting and anal penetration in this solitary species serves no apparent adaptive function.

Primates

Bonobos

Bonobos form a matriarchal society, unusual among apes. They are fully bisexual: both males and females engage in hetero- and homosexual behavior, being noted for female–female sex in particular, including between juveniles and adults. Roughly 60% of all bonobo sexual activity occurs between two or more females. While the homosexual bonding system in bonobos represents the highest frequency of homosexuality known in any primate species, homosexuality has been reported for all great apes, as well as a number of other primate species.

Dutch primatologist Frans de Waal, who extensively observed and filmed bonobos, believed that sexual activity is the bonobo's way of avoiding conflict. Anything that arouses the interest of more than one bonobo at a time, not just food, tends to result in sexual contact. If two bonobos approach a cardboard box thrown into their enclosure, they will briefly mount each other before playing with the box. Such situations lead to squabbles in most other species. But bonobos are quite tolerant, perhaps because they use sex to divert attention and to defuse tension.

Bonobo sex often occurs in aggressive contexts totally unrelated to food. A jealous male might chase another away from a female, after which the two males reunite and engage in scrotal rubbing. Or after a female hits a juvenile, the latter's mother may lunge at the aggressor, an action that is immediately followed by genital rubbing between the two adults.

Gorillas

Homosexual behavior among male gorillas has been studied. This behavior occurs more often in all-male bachelor packs in the wild and it is believed to play a role in social bonding. Homosexual behavior among female mountain gorillas has also been documented.

Japanese macaques

With the Japanese macaque, also known as the "snow monkey", same-sex relations are frequent, though rates vary between troops. Females will form "consortships" characterized by affectionate social and sexual activities. In some troops up to one quarter of the females form such bonds, which vary in duration from a few days to a few weeks. Often, strong and lasting friendships result from such pairings. Males also have same-sex relations, typically with multiple partners of the same age. Affectionate and playful activities are associated with such relations.

Orangutans
Homosexual behavior forms part of the natural repertoire of sexual or sociosexual behavior of orangutans. Male homosexual behavior occurs both in the wild and in captivity, and it occurs in both adolescent and mature individuals. Homosexual behavior in orangutans is not an artifact of captivity or contact with humans.

Monkeys
Among monkeys, Lionel Tiger and Robin Fox conducted a study on how Depo-Provera contraceptives lead to decreased male attraction to females.

Sheep
Ovis aries has attracted much attention due to the fact that around 8–10% of rams have an exclusive homosexual orientation. Such rams prefer to court and mount other rams only, even in the presence of estrous ewes. Moreover, around 18–22% of rams are bisexual.

Several observations indicate that male–male sexual preference in rams is sexually motivated. Rams routinely perform the same courtship behaviors (including foreleg kicks, nudges, vocalizations, anogenital sniffs and flehmen) prior to mounting other males as observed when other rams court and mount estrous females. Furthermore, pelvic thrusting and ejaculation often accompany same-sex mounts by rams.

A number of studies have reported differences in brain structure and function between male-oriented and female-oriented rams, suggesting that sexual partner preferences are neurologically hard-wired.
A 2003 study by Dr. Charles E. Roselli et al. (Oregon Health and Science University), states that homosexuality in male sheep is associated with a region in the rams' brains which the authors call the "ovine Sexually Dimorphic Nucleus" (oSDN) which is half the size of the corresponding region in heterosexual male sheep. Scientists found that, "The oSDN in rams that preferred females was significantly larger and contained more neurons than in male-oriented rams and ewes. In addition, the oSDN of the female-oriented rams expressed higher levels of aromatase, a substance that converts testosterone to estradiol, a form of estrogen which is believed to facilitate typical male sexual behaviors. Aromatase expression was no different between male-oriented rams and ewes [...] The dense cluster of neurons that comprise the oSDN express cytochrome P450 aromatase. Aromatase mRNA levels in the oSDN were significantly greater in female-oriented rams than in ewes, whereas male-oriented rams exhibited intermediate levels of expression." These results suggest that "... naturally occurring variations in sexual partner preferences may be related to differences in brain anatomy and its capacity for estrogen synthesis." As noted before, given the potential unagressiveness of the male population in question, the differing aromatase levels may also have been evidence of aggression levels, not sexuality. It should also be noted that the results of this particular study have not been confirmed by other studies.

The Merck Manual of Veterinary Medicine appears to consider homosexuality among sheep as a routine occurrence and an issue to be dealt with as a problem of animal husbandry.

Studies have failed to identify any compelling social factors that can predict or explain the variations in sexual partner preferences of domestic rams. Homosexual orientation and same-sex mounting in rams is not related to dominance, social rank or competitive ability. Indeed, male-oriented rams are not more or less dominant than female-oriented rams. Homosexual orientation in rams is also not affected by rearing conditions, i.e., rearing males in all-male groups, rearing male and female lambs together, early exposure of adolescent males to females and early social experiences with females do not promote or prevent homosexual orientation in rams. Male-oriented partner preference also does not appear to be an artifact caused by captivity or human management of sheep.

Homosexual courtship and sexual activity routinely occur among rams of wild sheep species, such as bighorn sheep (Ovis canadensis), thinhorn sheep (Ovis dalli), mouflons and urials (Ovis orientalis). Usually a higher ranking older male courts a younger male using a sequence of stylized movements. To initiate homosexual courtship, a courting male approaches the other male with his head and neck lowered and extended far forward in what is called the 'low-stretch' posture. He may combine this with the 'twist,' in which the courting male sharply rotates his head and points his muzzle toward the other male, often while flicking his tongue and making grumbling sounds. The courting male also often performs a 'foreleg kick', in which he snaps his front leg up against the other male's belly or between his hind legs. He also occasionally sniffs and nuzzles the other male's genital area and may perform the flehmen response. Thinhorn rams additionally lick the penis of the male they are courting. In response, the male being courted may rub his cheeks and forehead on the courting male's face, nibble and lick him, rub his horns on the courting male's neck, chest, or shoulders, and develop an erection. Males of another wild sheep species, the Asiatic mouflons, perform similar courtship behaviors towards fellow males.

Sexual activity between wild males typically involves mounting and anal intercourse. In Thinhorn sheep, genital licking also occurs. During mounting, the larger male usually mounts the smaller male by rearing up on his hind legs and placing his front legs on his partner's flanks. The mounting male usually has an erect penis and accomplishes full anal penetration while performing pelvic thrusts that may lead to ejaculation. The mounted male arches his back to facilitate the copulation. Homosexual courtship and sexual activity can also take place in groups composed of three to ten wild rams clustered together in a circle. These non-aggressive groups are called 'huddles' and involve rams rubbing, licking, nuzzling, horning, and mounting each other. Female Mountain sheep also engage in occasional courtship activities with one another and in sexual activities such as licking each other's genitals and mounting.

Spotted hyenas

The family structure of the spotted hyena is matriarchal, and dominance relationships with strong sexual elements are routinely observed between related females. Due largely to the female spotted hyena's unique urogenital system, which looks more like a penis rather than a vagina, early naturalists thought hyenas were hermaphroditic males who commonly practiced homosexuality. Early writings such as Ovid's Metamorphoses and the Physiologus suggested that the hyena continually changed its sex and nature from male to female and back again. In Paedagogus, Clement of Alexandria noted that the hyena (along with the hare) was "quite obsessed with sexual intercourse". Many Europeans associated the hyena with sexual deformity, prostitution, deviant sexual behavior, and even witchcraft.

The reality behind the confusing reports is the sexually aggressive behavior between the females, including mounting between females. Research has shown that "in contrast to most other female mammals, female Crocuta are male-like in appearance, larger than males, and substantially more aggressive," and they have "been masculinized without being defeminized".

Study of this unique genitalia and aggressive behavior in the female hyena has led to the understanding that more aggressive females are better able to compete for resources, including food and mating partners. Research has shown that "elevated levels of testosterone in utero" contribute to extra aggressiveness; both males and females mount members of both the same and opposite sex, who in turn are possibly acting more submissive because of lower levels of testosterone in utero.

Reptiles

Lizards

Several species of whiptail lizard (especially in the genus Aspidoscelis) consist only of females that have the ability to reproduce through parthenogenesis. Females engage in sexual behavior to stimulate ovulation, with their behavior following their hormonal cycles; during low levels of estrogen, these (female) lizards engage in "masculine" sexual roles. Those animals with currently high estrogen levels assume "feminine" sexual roles. Some parthenogenetic lizards that perform the courtship ritual have greater fertility than those kept in isolation due to an increase in hormones triggered by the sexual behaviors. So, even though asexual whiptail lizards populations lack males, sexual stimuli still increase reproductive success. From an evolutionary standpoint, these females are passing their full genetic code to all of their offspring (rather than the 50% of genes that would be passed in sexual reproduction). Certain species of gecko also reproduce by parthenogenesis.

Some species of sexually reproducing geckos have also been found to display homosexual behavior, e.g. the day geckos Phelsuma laticauda and Phelsuma cepediana.

Tortoises
Jonathan, the world's oldest tortoise (an Aldabra giant tortoise), had been mating with another tortoise named Frederica since 1991.  In 2017, it was discovered that Frederica was actually probably male all along, and was renamed Frederic.

Insects and arachnids
There is evidence of same-sex sexual behavior in at least 110 species of insects and arachnids. Scharf et al. says: "Males are more frequently involved in same-sex sexual (SSS)  behavior in the laboratory than in the field, and isolation, high density, and exposure to female pheromones increase its prevalence. SSS behavior is often shorter than the equivalent heterosexual behavior. Most cases can be explained via mistaken identification by the active (courting/mounting) male. Passive males often resist courting/mating attempts".

Scharf et al. continues: "SSS behavior has been reported in most insect orders, and Bagemihl (1999) provides a list of ~100 species of insects demonstrating such behavior. Yet, this list lacks detailed descriptions, and a more comprehensive summary of its prevalence in invertebrates, as well as ethology, causes, implications, and evolution of this behavior, remains lacking".

Dragonflies

Male homosexuality has been inferred in several species of dragonflies (the order Odonata). The cloacal pinchers of male damselflies and dragonflies inflict characteristic head damage to females during sex. A survey of 11 species of damsel and dragonflies has revealed such mating damages in 20 to 80% of the males too, indicating a fairly high occurrence of sexual coupling between males.

Fruit flies
Male Drosophila melanogaster flies bearing two copies of a mutant allele in the fruitless gene court and attempt to mate exclusively with other males. The genetic basis of animal homosexuality has been studied in the fly D. melanogaster. Here, multiple genes have been identified that can cause homosexual courtship and mating. These genes are thought to control behavior through pheromones as well as altering the structure of the animal's brains. These studies have also investigated the influence of environment on the likelihood of flies displaying homosexual behavior.

Bed bugs

Male bed bugs (Cimex lectularius) are sexually attracted to any newly fed individual and this results in homosexual mounting. This occurs in heterosexual mounting by the traumatic insemination in which the male pierces the female abdomen with his needle-like penis. In homosexual mating this risks abdominal injuries as males lack the female counteradaptive spermalege structure. Males produce alarm pheromones to reduce such homosexual mating.

See also

References

External links

National Geographic
Homosexual Behaviour in Animals An Evolutionary Perspective
Driscoll, E. V. (2008), Bisexual Species, Scientific American Mind, 19(3), pp. 68–73.
Nature or nurture? Innate social behaviors in the mouse brain

Sexual orientation and science
Ethology
Animal sexuality
Articles containing video clips
Homosexuality
LGBT studies